The 1975 South American Rugby Championship was the ninth edition of the competition of the leading national Rugby Union teams in South America.

The tournament was played in Asuncion and won by Argentina.

Standings 

{| class="wikitable"
|-
!width=165|Team
!width=40|Played
!width=40|Won
!width=40|Drawn
!width=40|Lost
!width=40|For
!width=40|Against
!width=40|Difference
!width=40|Pts
|- bgcolor=#ccffcc align=center
|align=left| 
|4||4||0||0||232||24||+ 208||8
|- align=center
|align=left| 
|4||3||0||1||93||65||+ 28||6
|- align=center
|align=left| 
|4||2||0||2||98||70||+ 28||4
|- align=center
|align=left| 
|4||1||0||3||42||139||- 97||2
|- align=center
|align=left| 
|4||0||0||4||27||194||- 167||0
|}

Results 

First round

Second round

Third round

Fourth round

Fifth round

References

 IRB – South American Championship 1975

1975
1975 rugby union tournaments for national teams
1975 in Argentine rugby union
rugby union
rugby union
rugby union
rugby union
International rugby union competitions hosted by Paraguay